Jaldega is a village in the Jaldega CD block in the Simdega subdivision of the Simdega district in the Indian state of Jharkhand.

Geography

Location                                    
Jaldega is located at

Area overview 
In the area presented in the map alongside, “the landscape is formed of hills and undulating plateau” in the south-western part of the Chota Nagpur Plateau. About 32% of the district is covered with forests (mark the shaded portions in the map.) It is an overwhelmingly rural area with 92.83% of the population living in the rural areas.  A major portion of the rural population depends on rain-fed agriculture (average annual rainfall: 1,100-1,200 mm) for a living.

Note: The map alongside presents some of the notable locations in the district. All places marked in the map are linked in the larger full screen map.

Civic administration  
There is a police station at Jaldega.

The headquarters of Jaldega CD block are located at Jaldega village.

Demographics 
According to the 2011 Census of India, Jaldega had a total population of 3,161, of which 1,496 (47%) were males and 1,665 (53%) were females. Population in the age range 0–6 years was 475. The total number of literate persons in Jaldenga was 2,016 (75.06% of the population over 6 years.

(*For language details see Jaldega block#Language and religion)

Education 
S.S. High School is a Hindi-medium coeducational institution established in 1964. It has facilities for teaching in class I to class XII. The school has a playground and a library with 234 books.

Kasturba Gandhi Balika Vidyalaya is a Hindi-medium institution established in 2007. It has facilities for teaching in class VI to class XII. The school has a playground and a library with 159 books and has 5 computers for teaching and learning purposes.

Project Girls High School Jaldega is a Hindi-medium girls only institute established in 1984. It has facilities for teaching in classes VI and X. It has a playground and a library with 250 books.

Model School Jaldega is an English-medium coeducational institute established in 2011. It has facilities for teaching from class VI to class X.

Healthcare   
There is a Community Health Centre (Hospital) at Jaldega.

References 

Villages in Simdega district